Kira Dikhtyar (born 1988) is a Russian-born American model and former gymnast. She is the founder of a production company, 90-60-90.

Early life and education 
Kira Dikhtyar was born in Moscow, Russia, in 1988. She attended the Moscow State University.

Career
Dikhtyar started out as a gymnast with the intention of becoming a coach later. She represented Russia's national junior team on the national level.

After being recruited by a modeling agency, MC2, which was founded by Jean-Luc Brunel, Dikhtyar decided to give up her gymnastics career. Her first work was for Vogue Italia. Over the years, her work has appeared in FHM, L’Officiel, and Playboy.

Dikhtyar has also worked in reality television and is known for her appearance in the reality TV show, The Face. She is also an UN Ambassador and works on reforming sexual consent laws.

In 2022, Dikhtyar started a new clothing line in Russia.

Filmography
 The Face (2014)
 Making the Day (2021)

References

Living people
1988 births
American female models
Russian female models
Russian emigrants to the United States
People from Moscow